Shangri-La County Stadium is a multi-purpose stadium in Shangri-La County, China.  It is currently used mostly for football matches and horse racing.  The stadium holds 25,000 spectators.

References

Football venues in China
Multi-purpose stadiums in China
Sports venues in Yunnan
Buildings and structures in Dêqên Tibetan Autonomous Prefecture